Joanna Kopcińska is a Polish politician currently serving as a Member of the European Parliament for the Law and Justice political party.

References

Living people
MEPs for Poland 2019–2024
Law and Justice MEPs
Law and Justice politicians
Women MEPs for Poland
Year of birth missing (living people)